Yonaba Creek is a stream in the U.S. state of Mississippi.

Yonaba is a name derived from the Choctaw language purported to mean "ironwood".

References

Rivers of Mississippi
Rivers of Lee County, Mississippi
Mississippi placenames of Native American origin